S. Selvaganapathy is an Indian politician and member of the Rajyasabha from Bharatiya Janata Party. Selvaganapathy was a member of the Puducherry Legislative Assembly from 3 June 2017 to 2 May 2021, as he was nominated by the Central Government of India. He is an educationist, runs Schools and BEd College.

References 

Living people
Year of birth missing (living people)
21st-century Indian politicians
People from Puducherry
Bharatiya Janata Party politicians from Puducherry
Puducherry MLAs 2016–2021
Puducherry politicians
Nominated members of the Puducherry Legislative Assembly
Rajya Sabha members from Puducherry